Gavin Gordon may refer to:

 Gavin Gordon (actor) (1901–1983), American film actor
 Gavin Gordon (composer) (1901–1970), Scottish composer, singer, actor
 Gavin Gordon (footballer) (born 1979), English footballer
 Gavin Gordon (rugby league) (born 1978), Irish rugby league footballer